Westfriedhof is an U-Bahn station in Munich on the U1 line of the Munich U-Bahn system, it opened on 24 May 1998, the extension onwards to Georg-Brauchle-Ring was completed in 2003. It is located in the course of the second main line on the border between the Munich districts Neuhausen-Nymphenburg and Moosach.

The station built below Orpheusstraße was opened to traffic on 24 May 1998. The subway station is served by the subway line . Since 12 December 2011, it has also been the terminus of the  reinforcement line, which only runs during rush hours. There is a link with other Munich public transport lines at above-ground tram stops.

From 1998 to 2003 it was the terminus of the  line and is the terminus of tram line . Because of its lighting design, it is occasionally used as a photo motif by advertising agencies and the special atmosphere has also been used as a record cover. The light comes from eleven lamps, each 3.80 metres in diameter, which have luminaires in blue, red and yellow. At the western end sunlight falls in. This divides the platform into different colours. Together with the rough walls, the station is reminiscent of a cave. Originally, the architect had planned a glass pane in front of the walls, but he liked it better that way. However, the walls had to be secured with a steel net in 2003, as individual pieces had loosened from the wall time and again. The barrier storey can be reached by rolling stairs, fixed staircases and a lift.

See also
List of Munich U-Bahn stations

References

Munich U-Bahn stations
Railway stations in Germany opened in 1998
Buildings and structures completed in 1998